The Athenaeum Portrait, also known as The Athenaeum, is an unfinished painting by Gilbert Stuart of United States President George Washington. Created in 1796, it is Stuart's most notable work. The painting depicts Washington at age 65, about three years before his death, on a brown background. It served as the model for the engraving that would be used for Washington's portrait on the United States one-dollar bill.

A corresponding portrait of Martha Washington is also known as the Athenaeum Portrait, and is exhibited near the painting of her husband at the Boston Museum of Fine Arts.

Name
The painting is called the "Athenaeum" as, after the death of Stuart, the portrait was sent to the Boston Athenaeum.

The painting
The Athenaeum  is Stuart's most famous work. He started painting the Athenaeum in 1796, in Germantown, Philadelphia (now a neighborhood within Philadelphia).

The painting is oil on canvas, and depicts only Washington's head and neck, painted when he was 65 years old (about three years before his death in 1799) on a brown background. The rest of the painting is unfinished. The frame was made by a frame maker, picture dealer, and entrepreneur named John Doggett.

Use as a model for other works

The painting was never delivered to Washington. Instead, Stuart used it as a model for many replicas, capitalizing on Washington's fame. After Washington's death, he used it to paint 130 copies which he sold for $100 each. More than 60 of these copies still exist. Reportedly, Stuart referred to the painting as "his hundred dollar bill" due to the amount he charged for the copies.

The Athenaeum Portrait was also used to produce a number of U.S. postage stamps of the 19th century and early 20th century.

Most notably, the Athenaeum Portrait served as the model for the engraving that would be used (in mirror image) for the United States one-dollar bill.

Provenance

The painting was owned by Stuart until he died in 1828. It was then owned by his daughter, Jane Stuart. It was then purchased in May 1831 for US$1,500 by the Trustees of the Boston Athenaeum, with money raised via subscription from the Washington Monument Association and 22 other subscribers. It was then given to the Boston Athenaeum by them. In 1876 the Boston Athenaeum deposited the painting at the Museum of Fine Arts, Boston. In 1980 it was bought by the Museum of Fine Arts, Boston and the National Portrait Gallery jointly from the Boston Athenaeum. It now resides in the Museum of Fine Arts, Boston, where it is currently on display.

References

External links
 
 Webpage for the Athenaeum Portrait at Museum of Fine Arts, Boston

 

1796 paintings
18th-century portraits
George Washington in art
Portraits of politicians
Portraits of men
Unfinished paintings
Paintings in the collection of the Museum of Fine Arts, Boston
Paintings by Gilbert Stuart